The Jordan himri (Carasobarbus canis) is a ray-finned fish species in the family Cyprinidae.

It is found in Israel, Jordan, and Syria. Its natural habitats are rivers and freshwater lakes. It is not considered a threatened species by the IUCN.

References

Carasobarbus
Fish described in 1842
Taxonomy articles created by Polbot